Sofía del Prado Prieto (born 11 February 1995) is a Spanish beauty pageant titleholder who won Miss Universe Spain 2017. She represented Spain at the Miss Universe 2017, finishing as a Top 10 finalist.

Early life 
Del Prado was born in Albacete, Castilla-La Mancha, Spain. Del Prado grew up in Villarrobledo, Albacete, Spain.

Education 
In 2015, Del Prado attended college in Madrid, Spain. Del Prado earned a degree in International Relations. Del Prado was an intern at an international winery in the Department of International Commerce.

Pageantry

On 30 July 2015, Del Prado was a contestant at the Miss Universe Spain 2015.

On 24 October 2015, Del Prado represented Spain at Reina Hispanoamericana 2015 in Santa Cruz, Bolivia and won that competition. In addition, del Prado also won Miss Sports and Miss Elegance Rosamar.

In 2017, del Prado again entered Miss Spain for a second attempt at being crowned. On 24 September 2017, at age 23, Del Prado won the title Miss Universe Spain 2017. Del Prado represented Spain at Miss Universe 2017 in Las Vegas, Nevada.  She finished in the Top 10.

References

1994 births
Living people
Miss Universe 2017 contestants
Miss Spain winners
Spanish female models
Spanish beauty pageant winners